East End Jewish Radicals, 1875–1914 is a 1975 book by historian William J. Fishman on the history of Jews in London's East End. It was published by Gerald Duckworth & Co in association with the Acton Society Trust. The American edition was published in the same year by Pantheon Books under the title Jewish Radicals: From Czarist Stetl to London Ghetto.

References 

 
 
 
 

1975 non-fiction books
English-language books
History books about Jews and Judaism
History books about anarchism
History books about London
Pantheon Books books